Operation Colombo was an operation undertaken by the DINA (the Chilean secret police) in 1975 to make political dissidents disappear. At least 119 people are alleged to have been abducted and later killed.  The magazines published a list of 119 dead political opponents.

One of these fake magazines, titled LEA, was published by Codex Editorial, a dependent of the Argentine Ministry of Welfare, directed by José López Rega, counselor of Isabel Perón and founder of the Triple A death squad.

Augusto Pinochet 
Chile's former military ruler, Augusto Pinochet, was placed under house arrest in connection with the kidnapping of at least three dissidents by his security services. 

Judge Juan Guzmán Tapia asked the Chilean justice to lift Pinochet's immunity after having accumulated proof that he had ordered the DINA to undertake this operation.

In September 2005, the Chilean Supreme Court decided to lift Pinochet's immunity on this case, charging judge Victor Montiglio of the investigations. In November 2005, prosecutors said that specialists appointed by the court in the Operation Colombo case had concluded that while he suffered from mild dementia, he was fit enough to stand trial. On this occasion, Pinochet met DINA head Manuel Contreras, who held him as responsible of the DINA and, therefore, of operation Colombo, for which both men may be jailed. Raúl Iturriaga, the vice-director of the DINA, has also been indicted in this case.

In December 2005 it was found that Pinochet was found fit to stand trial. However Pinochet died December 10, 2006, without being judged.

See also 
 Caravan of Death
 Operation Condor
 Dirty war

References

External links 
 Pinochet and ex-police-chief meet
 Pinochet found fit

1975 in Chile
Cold War
Dirty wars
Political and cultural purges
Operation Condor
Massacres in Chile
Anti-communist terrorism
Political violence in Chile
Dirección de Inteligencia Nacional